Captive! is the eighth novel in World of Adventure series by Gary Paulsen. It was published on November 1, 1995 by Random House.

Plot
The story is about Roman Sanchez and his classmates who are kidnapped by masked gunmen and threatened with death unless they are paid ransom money.

Novels by Gary Paulsen
1995 American novels
American young adult novels